The Hoboken Volunteer Ambulance Corps (HVAC or Hoboken EMS) is the primary 911 EMS provider in Hoboken, and the only full-time all-volunteer ambulance provider in Hudson County. The Corps responds to nearly 5000 calls for service yearly in Hoboken and, as needed, in neighboring areas.

History
The Hoboken Volunteer Ambulance Corps was initially formed in the early 1970s to augment the existing emergency medical response, which involved a police officer picking up a doctor from then-St. Mary's Hospital and driving them to the location of the call. The Corps was incorporated in 1971 with fourteen members and an ambulance purchased from Avenel Volunteer First Aid Squad. In the first year, the Corps responded to 648 calls, in 2011, they responded to nearly 5000.

Hurricane Sandy
In late October 2012, when much of the Northeastern United States was devastated by Hurricane Sandy, the Corps engaged in a multiple-week-long operation to support the city of Hoboken in its state of emergency. Despite widespread flooding leaving large parts of the city inaccessible even to the largest rescue vehicles, the Corps coordinated an effort to evacuate the low-lying Hoboken University Medical Center of its 131 patients, was forced to evacuate its building and base of operations when threatened by flooding, established a field hospital in a gym on nearby Stevens Institute of Technology, and logged over 5,000 person-hours to respond to almost 600 calls for service in the initial eight-day period.

Due to extremely heavy call volume, the city of Hoboken was supported by its neighboring communities, by an ALS "strike team" consisting of five ambulances deployed from Pennsylvania, and by elements of the 2nd Battalion 113th Infantry New Jersey Army National Guard. The Corps was initially forced to use front loaders to evacuate patients from flooded areas, and later used Army National Guard cargo trucks to transport patients to waiting ambulances.

Due to the storm and its aftereffects, the Corps lost four vehicles to flooding, including two of its three front line ambulances, a special operations disaster support truck, and a mobile communications bus. The Corps also suffered damage to their building and lost supplies and equipment.

Currently
The Corps continues to staff BLS ambulances 24/7. ALS services are provided by Jersey City Medical Center. The Corps also provides additional staff for special events and major emergencies, such as Hoboken's Italian Festival, major parades, and other days of expected major activity. The squad also supports and is supported by its neighbors through informal mutual aid agreements with neighboring Jersey City, Bayonne, Weehawken, and Union City.

Vehicles
The Corps maintains four fully equipped BLS ambulances. The vehicles are type III ambulances. These vehicles are rotated through for the day-to-day operations of the Corps. These vehicles carry AEDs, oxygen, glucose, epinephrine auto injectors (more commonly known as EpiPens), bandaging and splinting supplies, and transportation equipment. The four ambulances carry the fleet numbers 921, 922, 923 and 618, however these vehicles are all marked as 134, the Corps' radio call sign.

The Corps also maintains a supervisor SUV, used for incident command staff as well as general Corps business, several equipment trailers, two mass-casualty response units with specialized equipment for prolonged and mass-casualty incidents, a field communications truck, a golf cart with limited medical supplies, and several bicycles.

Communications
The Corps uses the same frequencies as the Hoboken Police Department for their primary dispatch, however are also able to use their "D1" frequency for internal communications, contacting mutual aid, and for primary dispatch at major emergencies or incidents where the standard police frequency is congested with police traffic. To support major incidents, the Corps' radio communication personnel are able to use the Field Communications bus or work with the city Emergency Operations Center to coordinate local Police, EMS, and Fire as well as outside agencies who may be responding to a major incident.

Special Operations
The Corps provides a response to all fires and other major emergencies, including on-scene triage and multiple ambulances for transport. The Corps will also mobilize for events such as the Mother's Day 2011 PATH train crash, the "Miracle on the Hudson", when a US Airways flight crash-landed into the Hudson River, the city's yearly St. Patrick's day festivities, the 2016 NJ Transit train crash and operated throughout Hurricane Sandy.

References

Ambulance services in the United States
Hoboken, New Jersey
Medical and health organizations based in New Jersey